Chingford and Woodford Green is a constituency in North East London represented in the House of Commons of the UK Parliament by Sir Iain Duncan Smith of the Conservative Party since its creation in 1997.

Constituency profile
The seat covers the outer London commuter suburbs of Chingford, Highams Park and Woodford with high levels of owner-occupier housing, along with part of the Epping Forest.  Once safely Conservative, the seat is now marginal with Labour due to young families and ethnic minority voters moving into the constituency.

Boundaries

The London Borough of Waltham Forest wards of Chingford Green, Endlebury, Hale End and Highams Park, Hatch Lane, Larkswood, Valley, as well as the London Borough of Redbridge wards of Church End and Monkhams have been selected to form the seat since inception.

Out of 24 council seats that make up Chingford and Woodford Green the Conservatives hold 18 and Labour hold 5.

The boundaries of Chingford and Woodford Green take in a large slice of the London Borough of Waltham Forest. The constituency includes Chingford in the north bordering Enfield down through Highams Park and Hatch Lane into Woodford Green & South Woodford and also takes in a part of the London Borough of Redbridge.

History

Before 1945, both Woodford and Chingford were part of Epping for general elections, for which wartime Conservative Prime Minister Winston Churchill was MP. The constituency was created in 1997 from parts of the former seats of Chingford and Wanstead & Woodford. Both seats previously had well-known MPs, Norman Tebbit and Winston Churchill respectively. Iain Duncan Smith had been MP for Chingford since 1992, then was elected MP for this constituency five years later in 1997.

Political history
Chingford and Woodford Green and its predecessors have been solid Conservative wards since the beginning of the Thatcher period in 1979. The closest contest in the 20th century was from the Labour Party at the 1997 general election, with a Conservative majority of over 5000; the Conservatives retained the seat in 2001 with a majority little changed on a low turnout. In 2005, the Conservative incumbent did better, getting twice as many votes as Labour with a swing to the party of 6.4% (over double that nationally) from Labour. The 2015 result gave the seat the 119th most marginal majority of the Conservative Party's 331 seats by percentage of majority. At the 2017 snap election, Duncan Smith was re-elected with a greatly reduced majority on a 7% swing to Labour, slightly more than a sixth of his 2010 margin; while this was in keeping with the large swings to Labour throughout Greater London at that election, it seems to suggest an increasingly marginal seat, even though the Conservatives hold three-quarters of the local council seats in the wards which make up the constituency. The 2019 general election saw the Conservatives retaining the seat, although with a smaller majority than 2017 due to a swing to Labour, despite significant movement against the opposing party nationwide.

Member of Parliament

Elections

Elections in the 2010s

Elections in the 2000s

Elections in the 1990s

See also
List of parliamentary constituencies in London

Notes

References

Sources
Election result, 2005 (BBC)
Election results, 1997 – 2001 (BBC)
Election results, 1997 – 2005  (Election Demon)
Election results, 1997 – 2005 (Guardian)

External links
nomis Constituency Profile for Chingford and Woodford Green — presenting data from the ONS annual population survey and other official statistics.
Politics Resources (Election results from 1922 onwards)
Electoral Calculus (Election results from 1955 onwards)

Constituencies of the Parliament of the United Kingdom established in 1997
Parliamentary constituencies in London
Politics of the London Borough of Waltham Forest
Politics of the London Borough of Redbridge
Chingford